Two Hearts in Waltz Time (Original title: Zwei Herzen im 3/4 Takt or Zwei Herzen im Dreivierteltakt, literally Two Hearts in 3/4 Time) is a 1930 German film directed by Géza von Bolváry and starring Irene Eisinger, Walter Janssen, Oskar Karlweis, Willi Forst, Gretl Theimer, and S.Z. Sakall. It is an operetta written directly for the screen, with music by Robert Stolz.

The film's sets were designed by the art director Robert Neppach.

Plot 
Nicki and Vicki, two librettists who also happen to be brothers, are presently in collaboration with composer Toni. All too aware of Toni's amorous escapades, Nicki and Vicki try to keep the existence of their pretty sister Hedi a secret. Suffering from an acute case of writer's block (he has yet to find an inspiration for his next production), Toni throws a huge party, which is boycotted by his friends and associates so that he'll keep his mind on his work. The only guest who does show up is uninvited—and surprise, that guest is sweet little Hedi, who turns out to be inspiration enough for ten operettas.

Songs 
Zwei Herzen im 3/4 Takt
In deinen Augen liegt das Herz von Wien!
Auch du wirst mich einmal betrügen!
In Wien, wo der Wein und der Walzer blüht

Cast

Other 
Released under its English language title in October 1930, Two Hearts in Waltz Time was the first foreign language film to be released with subtitles in the United States.

Notes

External links 

1930 films
1930 musical comedy films
German musical comedy films
Films of the Weimar Republic
1930s German-language films
Films directed by Géza von Bolváry
Operetta films
Films about composers
German black-and-white films
Films with screenplays by Franz Schulz
Films scored by Robert Stolz
1930s German films